The 1966 Italian Grand Prix was a Formula One motor race held at Monza on 4 September 1966. It was race 7 of 9 in both the 1966 World Championship of Drivers and the 1966 International Cup for Formula One Manufacturers. The race was the 36th Italian Grand Prix and the 32nd to be held at Monza. The race was held over 68 laps of the five kilometre circuit for a race distance of 391 kilometres.

The race was won by Italian driver Ludovico Scarfiotti driving a Ferrari 312 in his only Grand Prix victory. Scarfiotti led home his British team mate Mike Parkes by five seconds. Parkes only just defeated New Zealand racer Denny Hulme in his Brabham BT20, the pair separated by less than half a second.

While series points leader Jack Brabham stopped with an oil leak in his Brabham BT19 on lap seven, he secured his third world championship, and the unique achievement of becoming world champion in a car of his own make, when his only remaining points rival John Surtees stopped with a fuel leak in his Cooper T81 24 laps later.

Race report 

Jack Brabham was odds-on favourite for the Championship – only John Surtees could stop him and only then by winning all three remaining races. He was prevented from doing so by an impressive performance from his former employers Ferrari at their home track. Honda had brought a new 370 bhp 3 litre V12 engine for Richie Ginther, whilst Dan Gurney had his Weslake engine and Graham Hill had the BRM H16. Lorenzo Bandini and Mike Parkes led from the start, whilst Hill's engine gave up on the first lap, followed in retirement by Jackie Stewart on lap 5 with a fuel leak, and then Brabham on lap 8 with an engine failure which coated the car in oil. Jim Clark in the H16 Lotus was moving strongly through the field. On lap 17, Richie Ginther had a horrific accident, crashing heavily into the trees and being very fortunate to escape with his life. Once Clark had pitted, Ludovico Scarfiotti, Parkes, Surtees and Hill disputed the lead until Surtees withdrew with a split petrol tank which was pouring it all over his tyres and ending his championship chances. Denny Hulme had fought through the field to third place. But the race was Scarfiotti's, as he became the first Italian to win for Ferrari at Monza since Alberto Ascari in 1952. Parkes completed Ferrari's joy as he pipped Hulme by 0.3 seconds to claim second spot. Amidst all the celebrations, Jack Brabham was crowned champion. Apart from three NART entries in  this race was the last time a Ferrari car was entered by a privateer team when Giancarlo Baghetti drove a private car entered by the British Reg Parnell team.

Classification

Qualifying 

Clark, Geki, and Spence switched numbers for the race when they are driving the same cars.
Phil Hill's car was driven by Gurney in practice, but he would drive car #30 of Eagle-Weslake for the race.

Race

Championship standings after the race

Drivers' Championship standings

Constructors' Championship standings

 Notes: Only the top five positions are included for both sets of standings. Only the best 5 results counted towards the Championship. Numbers without parentheses are Championship points; numbers in parentheses are total points scored.

References

Italian Grand Prix
Italian Grand Prix
1966 in Italian motorsport